Western Libraries is the library system of the University of Western Ontario in London, Ontario. In 1898, the university Senate appointed James Waddell Tupper as the University of Western Ontario's first University Librarian. In 1918, John Davis Barnett founded the Western Libraries collection with a donation of 40,000 books from his personal library. Before this donation, the collection held less than 1000 different works.

Western Libraries has since grown to include eight locations, which are the D. B. Weldon Library, the Allyn and Betty Taylor Library, the C. B. Johnston Library, the Education Library, the John & Dotsa Bitove Family Law Library, the Music Library, the Archives and Research Collections Centre, and the Map and Data Centre. Across these locations the library collection contains over 11 million print and electronic items with an additional 60,000+ items added each year.

D.B. Weldon Library 
The D. B. Weldon Library (commonly shortened to "Weldon") is the largest academic library on the University of Western Ontario campus in London, Ontario, Canada, and one of the largest academic libraries in the country.

Colonel D. B. Weldon 
The library is named after Colonel Douglas Black Weldon, who fought in the First World War and commanded the London Regiment of the Royal Highland Fusiliers of Canada during the Second World War. He served on the university's Board of Governors from 1946 to 1967, and  his son David Black Weldon was Chancellor of the university from 1984 to 1988. The library of the Royal Canadian Regiment Museum in London is also named after him.

Architecture 
 The building itself is "modernist" and "angular", an example of the "new, sharply-planed brutalism" typical of buildings constructed on campus during the 1960s. It was built from 1968 to 1972 by London, Ontario architects Murphy, Schuller, Green & Martin, and was opened on June 1, 1972. It underwent renovations in 1997-1998 and 2006–2007, and 2008–2011. Beginning the planning process in 2017, Western Libraries embarked on a space revitalization project to again renovate Weldon Library, hiring an architecture firm to re-design the space while still honoring the buildings original brutalist design.

Collections 

Weldon Library serves the faculties of Arts & Humanities, Information & Media Studies and Social Science. Highlights of the collection include materials in the Government Publications Research Collection and an extensive collection of research materials on microfilm and microfiche.

The library has approximately 9 million items in print and on microfilm, making it the fourth-largest academic library in Canada.  The university archives are also located in the library, along with other special archives, including the Canadian Tire Heritage Collection, and the J.J. Talman Regional Collection, which archives material from throughout southwestern Ontario.

The ground floor contains periodicals and microfilm, and the first floor, where the entrance is located, contains circulation and research desks, as well as archives of government publications. The second through fifth floors contain the main collection of books, as well as reading and study areas.

Pride Library 

The Pride Library is a collection of over 6,000 books, periodicals, and audio-visual resources by and about LGBT people housed within the D.B. Weldon Library. The library is the first official queer resource centre at a Canadian university.  Since its founding in the Faculty of Arts in the late 1990s, The Pride Library has grown with the support of donors, volunteers, faculty, and administrators.

Subjects include the gay liberation movement, gay and lesbian literary history, coming out, women's health and safety, homophobia, bisexuality, trans life, pornography, censorship, and same-sex marriage.  Also included in the collection are early sexology works, homophobic classics, and queer pulps from the 1950s and 1960s.

The Pride Library was founded by Professor James Miller in his office in 1997. In the summer of 2005, it was relocated on the main floor of the Weldon Library and officially reopened on February 14, 2006. A donation of $50,000 from the university administration in the spring of 2006 covered the renovation of the new space and the conversion of the catalogued books into a circulating collection.

Stained glass window 
The front of the Pride Library is decorated with a stained-glass window. The window celebrates and commemorates 135 influential gay and lesbian authors. It was designed and constructed by London, Ontario artist Lynette Richards and consists of the Pride Library logo amid a list of some of history's most influential queer authors. The Pride Library logo contains a series of shelved books, coloured with the spectrum of the rainbow, supported by the logo of the now-disbanded Homophile Association of London Ontario (HALO), which has made significant contributions to the Pride Library.

Allyn and Betty Taylor Library 
The Allyn and Betty Taylor Library is the second-largest academic library on the University of Western Ontario campus. It serves the faculties of Engineering, Science, Health Sciences and the Schulich School of Medicine & Dentistry.

History 
The Allyn and Betty Taylor Library was officially opened on November 22, 1991, with the design and construction of the new library funded through the Renaissance Campaign (1989 –1994). At the time of the Library's opening, Allyn Taylor (Western's Chancellor from 1976 to 1980) was quoted as saying: "My long association with Western is very close to my heart. Betty and I are proud and thankful indeed to have our names linked with this fine, new library, and can only say how grateful we are to the anonymous benefactor responsible." The $11.8 million three-floor addition to the north side of the Natural Sciences Building had a total seating capacity of 1,000 in 1991.

Layout 
The main floor (M) contains the service desk, study rooms, as well as many large study tables, and is considered a "normal conversation area". The two lower floors, Ground (G), and Lower Ground (LG) contain upwards of one hundred study cubicles for quiet study, and is considered a "silent area". There are also six floors (S1-S6), which are known collectively as "the stacks", and house the majority of the print collection.

Study Spaces 
Collaborative learning spaces are ideal for preparing presentations, assignments, reciting presentations or studying independently. All areas are AODA compliant. Media Rooms and Media Tables are bookable by the Western community and are equipped with various techniques to facilitate collaboration, including multi-view display screens, adaptors, and projectors.

Music Library 
The Music Library is situated in Talbot College, its primary users are associated with the Don Wright Faculty of Music. As of 2008, the library possessed 67,471 scores, 25,600 LPs, 26,000 CDs, 31,460 books, 11,610 microforms (fiche, film and microcards), 2,600 rare books, scores, and libretti, 600 current periodicals and 402 videos.

External links 

 Allyn and Betty Taylor Library
 Western Libraries
Pride Library Website

References

Academic libraries in Canada
Libraries established in 1918
University of Western Ontario
1918 establishments in Ontario